The Azusa Pacific Cougars football program was a college football team that represented Azusa Pacific University. From 2012 to 2020, the team was a member of the Great Northwest Athletic Conference of NCAA Division II. Prior to the 2012 season, the Cougars had been an independent program in the NAIA. The Cougars had 10 head coaches since their first recorded football game in 1965. Azusa Pacific University decided to end its football program in December 2020 due to financial restructuring. The most famous player to play for the Cougars was Christian Okoye.

Playoff appearances

NCAA Division II
The Cougars appeared in the Division II playoffs two times with an overall record of 0–2.

Head coaches

References

 
American football teams established in 1965
1965 establishments in California